The Treskelodden Beds is a geologic formation exposed near Hornsund on the island of Spitsbergen, Svalbard in Norway. It preserves fossils dating back from the Gzhelian stage of the Carboniferous period to the Artinskian stage of the Permian period.

See also 
 List of fossiliferous stratigraphic units in Norway

References 

Geologic formations of Norway
Carboniferous Norway
Gzhelian
Permian Norway
Artinskian Stage
Geology of Svalbard